The Susquehanna River Bridge carries Interstate 76 (Pennsylvania Turnpike) across the Susquehanna River between Dauphin and York County near Harrisburg, Pennsylvania.

History
The original structure was built as a steel girder bridge with concrete piers.  The steel was provided from a plant operated by Bethlehem Steel, directly adjacent to the turnpike in Steelton, Pennsylvania. It was opened to traffic in 1950.

On November 16, 2004, the Turnpike Commission let a contract for a bridge to replace the 1950 span.  Two new 3-lane segmental, concrete signature spans were constructed just upriver from the old 4 lane span.  The new span was the first of its type built in Pennsylvania at a cost of nearly $100 million .  The westbound span opened on May 17, 2007, and the eastbound span was opened on June 17, 2007.  The new roadway and bridges opened to normal traffic flow in the summer of 2008. The old span was demolished on August 22, 2007.

See also
List of crossings of the Susquehanna River

References

External links
Susquehanna River Bridge project web site

Bridges in Harrisburg, Pennsylvania
Toll bridges in Pennsylvania
Bridges over the Susquehanna River
Bridges completed in 1950
Bridges completed in 2000
Road bridges in Pennsylvania
Interstate 76 (Ohio–New Jersey)
Pennsylvania Turnpike Commission
Bridges on the Interstate Highway System
Concrete bridges in the United States